Photocatalytic water splitting is an artificial photosynthesis process using photocatalysis for the dissociation of water (H2O) into hydrogen and oxygen. Only light energy (photons), water, and a catalyst(s) are needed, since this is what naturally occurs in natural photosynthetic oxygen production and CO2 fixation.

Hydrogen fuel production using water and light (photocatalytic water splitting), instead of petroleum, is an important renewable energy strategy.

Concepts 
2 mol  is split into 1 mol  and 2 mol  using light in the process shown below.

 

The process of water-splitting is a highly endothermic process (ΔH > 0). Water splitting occurs naturally in photosynthesis when the energy of four photons is absorbed and converted into chemical energy through a complex biochemical pathway (Dolai's or Kok's S-state diagrams).

O–H bond homolysis in water requires energy of 6.5 - 6.9 eV (UV photon). Infrared light has sufficient energy to mediate water splitting because it technically has enough energy for the net reaction. However, it does not have enough energy to mediate the elementary reactions leading to the various intermediates involved in water splitting (this is why there is still water on Earth). Nature overcomes this challenge by absorbing four visible photons. In the laboratory, this challenge is typically overcome by coupling the hydrogen production reaction with a sacrificial reductant other than water.

Materials used in photocatalytic water splitting fulfill the band requirements and typically have dopants and/or co-catalysts added to optimize their performance. A sample semiconductor with the proper band structure is titanium dioxide and is typically used with a co-catalyst such as platinum (Pt) to increase the rate of  production. A major problem in photocatalytic water splitting is photocatalyst decomposition and corrosion.

Method of evaluation 

Photocatalysts must conform to several key principles in order to be considered effective at water splitting. A key principle is that  and  evolution should occur in a stoichiometric 2:1 ratio; significant deviation could be due to a flaw in the experimental setup and/or a side reaction, neither of which indicate a reliable photocatalyst for water splitting. The prime measure of photocatalyst effectiveness is quantum yield (QY), which is:

 QY (%) = (Photochemical reaction rate) / (Photon absorption rate) × 100%

To assist in comparison, the rate of gas evolution can also be used. A photocatalyst that has a high quantum yield and gives a high rate of gas evolution is a better catalyst.

The other important factor for a photocatalyst is the range of light that is effective for operation. For example, a photocatalyst is more desirable to use visible photons than UV photons.

Photocatalysts 
The solar-to-hydrogen (STH) efficiency of photocatalytic water splitting, however, has remained very low. Here we have developed a strategy to achieve a high STH efficiency of 9.2 per cent using pure water, concentrated solar light and an indium gallium nitride photocatalyst. The success of this strategy originates from the synergistic effects of promoting forward hydrogen–oxygen evolution and inhibiting the reverse hydrogen–oxygen recombination by operating at an optimal reaction temperature (about 70 degrees Celsius), which can be directly achieved by harvesting the previously wasted infrared light in sunlight. Moreover, this temperature-dependent strategy also leads to an STH efficiency of about 7 per cent from widely available tap water and sea water and an STH efficiency of 6.2 per cent in a large-scale photocatalytic water-splitting system with a natural solar light capacity of 257 watts. Our study offers a practical approach to produce hydrogen fuel efficiently from natural solar light and water, overcoming the efficiency bottleneck of solar hydrogen production.

:La 
:La yielded the highest water splitting rate of photocatalysts without using sacrificial reagents.  This ultraviolet-based photocatalyst was reported to show water splitting rates of 9.7 mmol/h and a quantum yield of 56%. The nanostep structure of the material promotes water splitting as edges functioned as  production sites and the grooves functioned as  production sites. Addition of NiO particles as co-catalysts assisted in  production; this step used an impregnation method with an aqueous solution of •6 and evaporated the solution in the presence of the photocatalyst.  has a conduction band higher than that of NiO, so photo-generated electrons are more easily transferred to the conduction band of NiO for  evolution.

is another catalyst solely activated by UV and above light. It does not have the performance or quantum yield of :La. However, it can split water without the assistance of co-catalysts and gives a quantum yield of 6.5%, along with a water splitting rate of 1.21 mmol/h. This ability is due to the pillared structure of the photocatalyst, which involves  pillars connected by  triangle units. Loading with NiO did not assist the photocatalyst due to the highly active  evolution sites.

()() 
()() had the highest quantum yield in visible light for visible light-based photocatalysts that do not utilize sacrificial reagents as of October 2008. The photocatalyst featured a quantum yield of 5.9% and a water splitting rate of 0.4 mmol/h. Tuning the catalyst was done by increasing calcination temperatures for the final step in synthesizing the catalyst. Temperatures up to 600 °C helped to reduce the number of defects, while temperatures above 700 °C destroyed the local structure around zinc atoms and were thus undesirable. The treatment ultimately reduced the amount of surface Zn and O defects, which normally function as recombination sites, thus limiting photocatalytic activity.

Molecular catalysts 
Proton reduction catalysts based on earth-abundant elements carry out one side of the water-splitting half-reaction.

A mole of octahedral nickel(II) complex, [Ni(bztpen)]2+ (bztpen = N-benzyl-N,N’,N’-tris(pyridine-2-ylmethyl)ethylenediamine) produced 308,000 moles of hydrogen over 60 hours of electrolysis with an applied potential of -1.25 V vs. standard hydrogen electrode.

Cobalt-based photocatalysts have been reported, including tris(bipyridine) cobalt(II), compounds of cobalt ligated to certain cyclic polyamines, and some cobaloximes.

In 2014 researchers announced an approach that connected a chromophore to part of a larger organic ring that surrounded a cobalt atom. The process is less efficient than a platinum catalyst although cobalt is less expensive, potentially reducing costs. The Co(II) centers of both assemblies are high spin, in contrast to most previously described cobaloximes. Transient absorption optical spectroscopies indicate that charge recombination occurs through multiple ligand states within the photosensitizer modules.

Bismuth vanadate
Bismuth vanadate is a visible-light-driven photocatalyst with a bandgap of 2.4 eV. BV have demonstrated efficiencies of 5.2% for flat thin films and 8.2% for core-shell WO3@BiVO4 nanorods with thin absorbers.

Bismuth oxides 
Bismuth oxides are characterized by visible light absorption properties, just like vanadates.

Tungsten diselenide (WSe2) 
Tungsten diselenide has photocatalytic properties that might be a key to more efficient electrolysis.

III-V semiconductor systems 
Systems based on III-V semiconductors, such as InGaP, enable solar-to-hydrogen efficiencies of up to 14%. Challenges include long-term stability and cost.

2D semiconductor systems 

Aluminum‐based metal-organic frameworks (MOF) 
An aluminum‐based metal-organic framework (MOF) made from 2‐aminoterephthalate can be modified by incorporating Ni2+ cations into the pores through coordination with the amino groups.Molybdenum disulfide

Porous organic polymers (POPs)

Organic semiconductor photocatalysts, in particular porous organic polymers (POPs), attracted attention due to their low cost, low toxicity, and tunable light absorption vs inorganic counterparts. They display hHigh porosity, low density, diverse composition, facile functionalization, high chemical/thermal stability, as well as high surface areas. Efficient conversion of hydrophobic polymers into hydrophilic polymer nano-dots (Pdots) increased polymer-water interfacial contact, which significantly improved performance.

Ansa-Titanocene(III/IV) Triflate Complexes 
Beweries, et. al., developed a light-driven "losed cycle of water splitting using ansa-titanocene(III/IV) triflate complexes".

Indium gallium nitride 
An Indium gallium nitride (InxGa1-xN) photocatalyst achieved a solar-to-hydrogen efficiency of 9.2% from pure water and concentrated sunlight. The effiency is due to the synergistic effects of promoting hydrogen–oxygen evolution and inhibiting recombination by operating at an optimal reaction temperature (~70 degrees C), powered by harvesting previously wasted infrared light. An STH efficiency of about 7% was realized from tap water and seawater and efficiency of 6.2% in a larger-scale system with a solar light capacity of 257 watts.

Sacrificial reagents

Solid solutions   with different Zn concentration (0.2 < x < 0.35) have been investigated in the production of hydrogen from aqueous solutions containing  as sacrificial reagents under visible light. Textural, structural and surface catalyst properties were determined by  adsorption isotherms, UV–vis spectroscopy, SEM and XRD and related to the activity results in hydrogen production from water splitting under visible light. It was reported that the crystallinity and energy band structure of the   solid solutions depend on their Zn atomic concentration. The hydrogen production rate increased gradually as Zn concentration on photocatalysts increased from 0.2 to 0.3. The subsequent increase in the Zn fraction up to 0.35 reduced production. Variation in photoactivity was analyzed for changes in crystallinity, level of the conduction band and light absorption ability of   solid solutions derived from their Zn atomic concentration.

See also 
 Artificial photosynthesis
 Photochemical reduction of carbon dioxide
 Electrolysis of water
 Photoelectrolysis of water

References 

Environmental chemistry
Hydrogen production
Photochemistry